Singulato Motors is the new energy vehicle brand of Chi Che-hung Technology Co., Ltd,. Singulato was founded in December 2014 in Beijing as an internet company to produce premium Chinese new energy vehicles. Singulato Motors aims to develop new energy vehicles (NEV), autonomous driving systems, automotive networking services with a focus on big data development and cloud computing technologies.

In April 2016, Singulato introduced its first EV product, the mid-size Singulato iS6 electric SUV. Singulato started plans for small batch production in the end of 2017 and mass production started by March 2018. The Singulato iS6 electric SUV was priced between ¥200,000 and ¥300,000.

Products 
Current product includes the following:
Singulato iS6-Electric mid-size crossover
Singulato iM8 (concept)-electric MPV
Singulato iC3 (concept)-electric city car based on the Toyota iQ

References

External links 
  Singulato Auto

Car manufacturers of China
Vehicle manufacturing companies established in 2014
Chinese companies established in 2014
Chinese brands
Car brands
Luxury motor vehicle manufacturers
Electric vehicle manufacturers of China
2014 establishments in China
Vehicle manufacturing companies